French Canadians are an ethnic group comprising Canadians of French language and descent.

French Canadian may also refer to:

 Francophone Canadians, Canadians with French as their native language, regardless of descent
 Anyone who speaks the French language in Canada, regardless of descent or native language
 Canada, a New France colony in present-day Canada that developed into Quebec
 Habitants, the inhabitants of New France Canada
 French Canadian Americans, French Canadians in the United States

See also 
 Canadian French, Canadian dialects of French